The 2005 Brasil Open was an ATP men's tennis tournament held in Mata de São João, Brazil. It was the fifth edition of the tournament and was held from February 14 to February 21. Rafael Nadal won the singles title.

Singles main draw entrants

Seeds

1 Rankings as of 14 February 2005.

Other entrants
The following players received wildcards into the main draw:
  Àlex Corretja
  André Sá
  Júlio Silva

The following players received entry from the qualifying draw:
  Peter Luczak
  Juan Antonio Marín
  Edgardo Massa
  Martín Vassallo Argüello

The following player received entry as a lucky loser:
  Guillermo García López

The following player received entry as a special exemption:
  Mariano Puerta

Withdrawals
Before the tournament
  Gastón Gaudio (Pubalgia)

Retirements
During the tournament
  David Ferrer (Flu)
  Óscar Hernández (Right ankle sprain)
  Filippo Volandri (Flu)
  Martín Vassallo Argüello (Heat stress)

Doubles main draw entrants

Seeds

Other entrants
The following pairs received wildcards into the main draw:
  Marcos Daniel /  Franco Ferreiro
  Henrique Mello /  Ricardo Mello

Withdrawals
During the tournament
  Alberto Martín (lower back pain)

Finals

Singles

 Rafael Nadal defeated  Alberto Martín 6–0, 6–7(2–7), 6–1
 It was Nadal's 2nd title of the year and the 5th of his career.

Doubles

 František Čermák /  Leoš Friedl defeated  José Acasuso /  Ignacio González King 6–4, 6–4
 It was Čermák's 2nd title of the year and the 7th of his career. It was Friedl's 2nd title of the year and the 7th of his career.

References

External links
 ATP Tournament Profile
 Official Results Archive (ATP)
 Official Results Archive (ITF)

 
Brasil Open
Brasil Open